Pommelsbrunn is a municipality in the district of Nürnberger Land, Bavaria, Germany.

Ortsteile
Pommelsbrunn comprises 22 boroughs (Ortsteile):

References

External links
 

Nürnberger Land